Cho Byung-Young  (born January 22, 1966) is a South Korean footballer

He graduated in Andong National University, and played for LG Cheetahs.

Club career 
1988-1997 Lucky-Goldstar Hwangso / LG Cheetahs / Anyang LG Cheetahs

Honours

Player
 Lucky-Goldstar Hwangso / LG Cheetahs / Anyang LG Cheetahs
 K-League Winners (1) : 1990

Individual

References

External links
 

K League 1 players
FC Seoul players
South Korean footballers
1966 births
Living people
Association football midfielders